Players and pairs who neither have high enough rankings nor receive wild cards may participate in a qualifying tournament held one week before the annual Wimbledon Tennis Championships.

Seeds

  John Paul Fruttero /  Raven Klaasen (first round)
  Sanchai Ratiwatana /  Sonchat Ratiwatana (qualifying competition, withdrew, lucky losers)
  Bobby Reynolds /  Izak van der Merwe (qualified)  Hsieh Cheng-peng /  Lee Hsin-han (first round)
  Andre Begemann /  Igor Zelenay (qualified)
  Colin Ebelthite /  John Peers (qualifying competition, lucky losers)
  Nicholas Monroe /  Simon Stadler (first round)
  Adrián Menéndez Maceiras /  Philipp Oswald (qualifying competition)

Qualifiers

  Andre Begemann /  Igor Zelenay
  Matthias Bachinger /  Tobias Kamke
  Bobby Reynolds /  Izak van der Merwe
  Lewis Burton /  George Morgan

Lucky losers

  Sanchai Ratiwatana /  Sonchat Ratiwatana
  Colin Ebelthite /  John Peers

Qualifying draw

First qualifier

Second qualifier

Third qualifier

Fourth qualifier

External links

2012 Wimbledon Championships – Men's draws and results at the International Tennis Federation

Men's Doubles Qualifying
Wimbledon Championship by year – Men's doubles qualifying